Antonio Bruni (born c. 1550 – died 1598) was an Albanian commander and spy from Ulcinj, part of the Albanian Bruni family, in the 16th century. He was the uncle of Bartolomeo Bruti. Members of the family worked for the Venetians, the Papacy and the Ottomans. Ottoman conquest of the city forced Bruni eventually to flee to Venice where he was educated by the Jesuits in May 1572 in Rome and he was a doctorate in Avignon. He also worked for one of his cousins in Moldavia. Bruni's father was Gasparo Bruni, the first knight of Malta and the commander of the Papacys fleet during the Battle of Lepanto. In August 1591, Bruni returned to Koper and was elected as the overseer of the grain store.

Petru Schiopul 
Petru Schipoul, Voivod of Moldavia, abandoned his throne and fled to Habsburg territory where he contacted Bruni in Koper in 1592, according to a letter which Bruni presented to the elected pope Clement VIII in Rome. Before Petru Schipouls decision to leave, he received a loan of 11,300 ducats in advance from a Ragusan merchant in Moldavia named Giovanni de Marini Poli who had come to collect sheep and cattle. However Schipoul fled and the new Voivode Aron refused to pay his predecessors debts. Marini Poli pursued Petru for the money and in May 1593, Antonio Bruni traveled to Bolzano where Petru was and made him sign a legal document empowering Antonio to speak and act on Petrus behalf. This proved that Antonio was fluent in Romanian. For seven months Bruni stayed in Tyrol helping Petru with his legal defense in court against Marini Poli. In 1594 Petru died and his family members stripped the house of possessions which Bruni opposed. He also felt a special responsibility for the son of Petru, Stefan. In 1596 he submitted a memorandum to the Austrians suggesting an anti-Ottoman geostrategic plan.

Death 
It is believed that Antonio Bruni died from the plague during his travels between Koper and Bolzano in Trieste July 1598. Bruni was the first Albanian to write a general description of Albania which was a major source of information in Lazaro Soranzos L'Ottomanno (1598). Antonio Bruni had an insiders view of the empire; his work had taken him to such places as Vlorë, on the southern coast of Albania, and Constanta, on the Black Sea coast, and he also stayed in Moldavia. In his writings, he identified the ancestors of the Albanians with Goths or Macedonians. Bruni was a friend of Innocentius Stoicinus, bishop of Lezhe in August 1596. According to Mekjashi in 1603, Bruni had intervened in Rome to save Stoicinus from punishment for immoral behavior.

References 

Albanian diplomats
People from Ulcinj
Year of birth unknown
1550s births

1598 deaths
Year of birth uncertain